Tregaswith is a hamlet in the parish of St Columb Major, Cornwall. It is situated to the south-west of the town of St Columb, and just south of the A3059 main road between St Columb and Newquay. The hamlet is about 1 mile from RAF St Mawgan airfield.

References

Hamlets in Cornwall
St Columb Major